Tô Lâm (born 10 July 1957) is a Vietnamese politician, who has been Minister of Public Security of Vietnam since 9 April 2016. Tô Lâm is a member of the 12th Politburo of the Communist Party of Vietnam and considered to be one of the more promising members of the Vietnamese Government, having previously served as Deputy Minister of Public Security on an exemplary level. Tô Lâm became a member of the Communist Party of Vietnam on 22 August 1981.

Childhood
Tô Lâm was born on 10 July 1957 in Hung Yen Province, Vietnam.

Early career

He attended the People's Police School in 1974. From October 1974 to October 1979: Student at the People’s Security Academy

October 1979 – December 1988: Working at the Political Protection Department I, the Ministry of Public Security

December 1988 – 1993: Cadre; Deputy Chief of the Political Protection Department I; the Ministry of Public Security

1993-2006: Deputy Director of the Political Protection Department I, Director of the Political Protection Department  III, the Ministry of Public Security;

2006-2009: Deputy Director of the General Security Department, Permanent Deputy Director of the General Security Department in charge of the Political Protection Department I, the Ministry of Public Security; appointed as Major-general in 2007

2009 – August, 2010: Director of the General Security Department I, the Ministry of Public Security; appointed as Lieutenant-General in July, 2010

August 2010 – January 2016: Deputy Minister of Public Security; a member of the Party Central Committee (at the 11th Party Congress)

June 4, 2011: To Lam was appointed as the new Secretary of the Central Police Party Committee

September 16, 2014: The Minister of Public Security, Lieutenant General To Lam, was promoted to the rank of Colonel General by President Truong Tan Sang 

January 2016 – April 2016: Senior Lieutenant-General/Colonel General; Deputy Minister of Public Security; a member of the Politburo

April 27, 2016: He was appointed Vice Chairman of the Central Steering Committee on Anti-corruption by President Tran Dai Quang 

July 31, 2016: He was appointed Head of Central Highlands Steering Committee, replacing Tran Dai Quang

July 27, 2016 – present: Member of the Politburo; Head of Central Highlands Steering Committee, Minister of Public Security, Vice Chairman of the Central Steering Committee on Anti-corruption 

January 29, 2019: The Minister of Public Security, Colonel General To Lam, was promoted to the rank of General by President Nguyen Phu Trong

Controversies
In November 2021, a video was posted on the TikTok account of celebrity chef Nusret Gökçe, widely known by his nickname Salt Bae, shows Tô and his entourage dining at Gökçe's Nusr-Et Steakhouse in London after attending the 2021 United Nations Climate Change Conference in Glasgow and laying wreath at the tomb of Karl Marx. In the clip, he was also seen personally putting a piece of gold-plated steak by the chef in his mouth and then giving a thumbs-up. The video was deleted from Gökçe’s TikTok account just 30 minutes after a Vietnamese activist shared it on his Facebook page. The event has caused outrage among Vietnamese netizens as the feast took place when the majority of the Vietnamese population are struggling with a months-long economic shutdown as a result of the coronavirus pandemic. Many also wondered how Tô could afford a steak that costs 1,450 pounds ($1,975) on a monthly salary of roughly $660.

Despite attracting much attention from the international media, the Vietnamese press did not mention this event. On Facebook, the keyword #saltbae was blocked for a few days worldwide, and it was only accessible on November 9. Facebook did not state the reason for the block and did not say whether or not the Vietnamese government had requested them to do so. On November 16, 2021, a citizen living in Đà Nẵng was repeatedly summoned by the police for unknown reasons after posting a video on his personal Facebook page - in which he imitated the gesture of chef Nusret Gökce.

Awards
: Military Exploit Order 3rd class
: Military Exploit Order 1st class

References

1957 births
Living people
Government ministers of Vietnam
Members of the 12th Politburo of the Communist Party of Vietnam
Members of the 13th Politburo of the Communist Party of Vietnam
Members of the 11th Central Committee of the Communist Party of Vietnam
Members of the 12th Central Committee of the Communist Party of Vietnam
Members of the 13th Central Committee of the Communist Party of Vietnam
People from Ninh Bình province